Alastor baidoensis is a species of wasp in the family Vespidae.

References

baidoensis
Insects described in 1983